Haridwar – Jammu Tawi Express is an Express train belonging to Northern Railway zone of Indian Railways that run between  and  in India.

Background
This train was inaugurated on 14 August 2016, from Jammu Tawi flagged off by Suresh Prabhu, Former Minister of Railways by using video conferencing from Mumbai for more connectivity between Haridwar and Jammu tawi.

Service
Frequency of this train is weekly and it covers the distance of 535 km with an average speed of 47 km/h on both sides.

Routes

Traction
As the route is fully electrified an WAP-4 and WAP-7 pulls the train to its destination on both sides.

External links
 14605 Haridwar-Jammu Tawi Express
 14606 Jammu Tawi-Haridwar Express

References

Express trains in India
Rail transport in Haryana
Rail transport in Punjab, India
Rail transport in Jammu and Kashmir
Trains from Haridwar
Transport in Jammu